The Chief Election Commissioner (CEC) heads the Election Commission of Bangladesh, a body constitutionally empowered to conduct free and fair elections.

Appointment and removal
The appointment of the Chief Election Commissioner of Bangladesh and other Election Commissioners (if any) is made by the President. Under the Constitution the term of office of any Election Commissioner is five years from the date on which he enters upon office. A person who has held office as Chief Election Commissioner is not eligible for appointment in the service of the Republic.  Any other Election Commissioner is, on ceasing to hold such office, eligible for appointment as Chief Election Commissioner, but is not eligible for appointment in the service of the Republic.

Duties and functions

In addition to their duties and functions as an election commissioner, the chief election commissioner acts as chairperson of the commission.

List of Chief Election Commissioners of Bangladesh
The following have held the post of the Chief Election Commissioner of Bangladesh.

See also
Election Commission of Bangladesh
Election Commissioner of Bangladesh
Elections in Bangladesh

References

Elections in Bangladesh
Election Commission of Bangladesh